Little Traverse Conservancy is a land conservancy based in Harbor Springs, Michigan, in the United States.

It is made up of two Michigan non-profit corporations, Little Traverse Conservancy, Inc., founded in 1972, and Little Traverse Conservancy Conservation Trust, founded in 1990.

References

External links

Nature reserves in Michigan
Non-profit organizations based in Michigan
1972 establishments in Michigan